Contact is the second studio album by American band Silver Apples, released in 1969 by record label Kapp.

Contact 

Bart Bealmear of AllMusic wrote, "Aside from Simeon's use of a banjo on a couple of tracks, the music on Contact does not differ from that of their debut. One aspect improved upon was the lyrics; many possess the same "cosmic" element found on Silver Apples, but others are full of bitterness, pain, paranoia and confusion. In turn, the lead oscillator is used to greater effect, reflecting this newfound intensity."

Release 

Contact was released in 1969 by record label Kapp.

The album was re-released in 1997 by MCA Records compiled with the band's first album, Silver Apples. It was also re-released illegally on compact disc and vinyl in 2003 by Radioactive Records in the UK.

Album cover controversy 

The front and back cover artwork is infamous for generating a lawsuit from Pan Am Airlines. The front features the Silver Apples in a Pan Am cockpit, while the back shows the band amongst plane wreckage playing banjos. The resulting lawsuit by Pan Am against Silver Apples led to the breakup of the band.

Legacy 

The Wire placed Contact in their list "One Hundred Records That Set the World on Fire (While No One Was Listening)".

Track listing

Personnel 
 Silver Apples

 Danny Taylor – vocals, drums, percussion
 Simeon – vocals, oscillators, banjo

 Technical

 Jack Hunt – engineering
 Charlie Silver – sleeve photography

References 

1969 albums
Silver Apples albums
Kapp Records albums
Radioactive Records albums
MCA Records albums